E. asiaticus may refer to:

 Ephippiorhynchus asiaticus, a bird species
 Euronychodon asiaticus, a dinosaur species

See also 

 Asiaticus (disambiguation)